Río Turbio Airport  is an airport serving Río Turbio, a town in the Santa Cruz Province of Argentina.

Runway length includes  displaced thresholds on each end. The El Turbio non-directional beacon (Ident: BIO) is located on the field.

See also

Transport in Argentina
List of airports in Argentina

References

External links
RYO flights
OpenStreetMap - Rio Turbio Airport
FallingRain - 28 de Noviembre Airport

Airports in Argentina